Rubén Ramírez Hidalgo was the defending champion, but lost to Diego Sebastián Schwartzman in the first round.
Adrian Ungur defeated Schwartzman 4–6, 6–0, 6–2 in the final to win the title.

Seeds

Draw

Finals

Top half

Bottom half

External Links
 Main Draw
 Qualifying Draw

Tunis Openandnbsp;- Singles
2013 Singles